The R336 is a Regional Route in South Africa. It runs east/west. The western origin is the R75. From there, it passes through Kirkwood and ends at Addo at the R335.

External links
 Routes Travel Info

References

Regional Routes in the Eastern Cape